P. V. Rajendran is an Indian politician and former Member of the Legislative Assembly of Tamil Nadu. He was elected to the Tamil Nadu legislative assembly as an Indian National Congress candidate from Vedaranyam constituency in 1989 and 1991 elections. He has also won the 1996 Parliamentary Elections by contesting from the Mayiladuthurai Constituency. He served as the Member of Parliament from 1996 to 1998, representing Mayiladuthurai Constituency.

References 

Indian National Congress politicians from Tamil Nadu
Living people
Tamil Maanila Congress politicians
India MPs 1996–1997
Lok Sabha members from Tamil Nadu
People from Mayiladuthurai district
Year of birth missing (living people)
Tamil Nadu MLAs 1991–1996